The Slovenian Second Basketball League, abbreviated as the 2. SKL, is the second-highest basketball league in Slovenia.

Format
Each team plays 22 matches (11 home and 11 away). Teams play two matches against each other, once at home and once at their opponent's arena.
 The top eight teams qualify for the playoffs
 The bottom four teams qualify for the relegation round
 The winner of the playoffs is promoted to the 1. SKL
 The two worst teams of the relegation round are relegated to the 3. SKL.

Current teams
As of the 2022–23 season

Brinox Medvode
Celje
ECE Triglav Kranj
Gorica
Janče Ljubljana
Ježica
Litija
Mesarija Prunk Sežana
Portorož
Postojna
Slovan
Troti

List of winners

Statistical leaders

References

External links
 Official website 

2
Second level basketball leagues in Europe
Sports leagues established in 1994
1994 establishments in Slovenia